The February 2014 nor'easter was a major nor'easter that produced a damaging snow and ice storm that affected the Southern United States and East Coast of the United States, bringing with it up to a foot of snow and crippling ice across parts of the South. Thousands if not hundreds of thousands of people were left in the dark for days, possibly even up to 2 weeks without power. Delta Air Lines canceled over 2,000 flights, and it was reported by 8:00 p.m. Thursday, February 13, that as many as 6,500 flights originating in or destined for the United States had been canceled. On that day 70 percent of flights were cancelled at airports in Baltimore, Philadelphia, Washington, D.C., and Charlotte.

Approximately 1.2 million homes and businesses lost power as the storm moved from the South through the Northeast. By the evening of Thursday, February 13, about 550,000 customers remained in the dark, mostly in South Carolina and Georgia.

Meteorological history
On February 11, a quick-moving area of low pressure moved across the Southeast, bringing rain and snow to areas like Atlanta, interacting with some of the cold air to the north of it. It then quickly moved offshore by roughly 3 p.m. This part of the storm was only the beginning of a crippling 2-day streak of winter nightmares across the South.

Later on February 11, another area of low pressure formed on the extreme southern edge of the Gulf Coast, near the TX–LA border. Drawing moisture from the Gulf of Mexico, it was able to fire up a small area of showers and thunderstorms near the coastline. As it tracked eastward, it began to interact with the cold air above it, producing an area of ice and snow on its backside as it moved to the east. On February 12, the swath of ice exploded in size as the conditions for freezing rain began to come together. Areas from eastern Alabama, including Atlanta in Georgia to the Southeast coast and South Carolina were included in this swath of icy precipitation. Meanwhile, to the south, near the Gulf Coast, heavy showers and thunderstorms were consisted in a streak of rain stretching up to southern parts of Georgia. As the low moved east, it then dissipated as a new area of low pressure developed off the South Carolina coast late on February 12, and that began to strengthen as it tracked to the north, placing the Northeast in the fire zone for the winter storm.

Early on February 13, more snow began to develop on the northern side of the storm as the precipitation shield approached the New York metropolitan area in colder air. At the same time, warmer air was beginning to funnel into the storm system, and as a result the rain/snow line slowly creeped up the state of New Jersey as the warm air began to further intrude into the winter storm. By 10 a.m, most of the precipitation had moved north of New York City, and began to reach into areas like Boston. Even though the area of low pressure, which had now deepened to  late on February 13, was offshore of the East Coast, little to no precipitation was falling as a result of dry air to funnel its way into the storm.

The system then continued to depart from the East Coast, before finally dissipating on February 24 near Europe.

Impact

Texas to Alabama
Four people died in traffic accidents in Texas due to ice, and in Round Rock on February 11, a single accident resulting from ice on a bridge affected 20 vehicles. Mississippi had two deaths attributed to the weather. Several tractor-trailers jackknifed on Interstate 65 in northeast Alabama.

Georgia

After being caught unprepared by another storm two weeks earlier, officials in metro Atlanta were much better prepared for this storm, having put down so much sand and gravel that by the weekend residents were asking for street sweeping to clean up the dust and potentially windshield-cracking stones it left behind. Most businesses and all schools were closed, and few people were on the roads.  Governor Nathan Deal declared a state of emergency, which he did not do two weeks earlier.

The forecast was for freezing rain comparable to the January 2000 ice storms, which caused 500,000 to lose power and resulted in $35 million in damage, while areas of further-north Georgia received unusually heavy snows. Precipitation started as light rain late on the 10th, with significant snow by the following morning while still above freezing, turning back to light rain before ending by mid-day. More light rain began after midnight, changing to snow as temperatures fell, then to sleet, freezing rain, back to sleet again before another significant snow by the morning of the 13th.

Areas north of the city generally got mostly snow and sleet, while a large swath from the south metro area eastward got the heaviest ice accumulations, though a dry slot at mid-day proved to be much more of a factor in limiting accumulations than had previously been forecast. The worst damages occurred in east Georgia, where over 80% of Augusta was left in the dark, and the Augusta National Golf Club was left littered with branches and other damaged landscaping just a few weeks before the Masters Tournament, in addition to a leaking water tower. The historic Eisenhower Tree, located on the 17th hole of the golf course, suffered irreversible damage and had to be removed. The storm damaged $65 million worth of timber. Further concerning residents was a magnitude 4.1 earthquake two days later, followed by a 3.2 aftershock two days later, at which time most power had been restored, after the storm.

Several people were injured in sledding accidents. One being taken to a hospital near Holly Springs was in an ambulance that was hit by a skidding car, which then hit a Georgia National Guard vehicle that was escorting the ambulance. The GNG vehicle then took the young child the rest of the way to get medical attention for the original injuries (none were incurred by anyone during the accident). One woman died of hypothermia without heat in her home. The Oconee County Sheriff's Office jokingly canceled Valentine's Day, while many florists were late for deliveries to customers after their own incoming flower shipments were delayed.

By late February 16, only a few hundred were still without power in east Georgia.

Carolinas
In parts of North Carolina, the forecast ice storm, which would follow snow, was expected to be the worst since December 2002. Around 6–12 inches of snow was dropped in some areas, along with accumulating ice. Governor Pat McCrory, declaring a state of emergency, warned people to be prepared. Early on February 12, 6,500 Duke Energy Progress customers in the Wilmington area had lost power. Winston-Salem had  of snow, the most in 15 years, but areas to the north and west had over twice that. Three people died in North Carolina. Two of those died in car accidents, one in Chatham County and one in Moore County. The other died from a falling branch in Pender County. 100,000 lost power in the state. On February 13, President Barack Obama declared South Carolina a disaster area after a petition from Governor Nikki Haley, making the state eligible for Federal Emergency Management Agency aid. Two and a half years, or 11 percent, of the state's timber was lost. The $360 million in damage was the worst for a storm since Hurricane Hugo in 1989. 15 percent of the damaged timber was salvaged, with 10 percent of value recovered.

Mid Atlantic

Baltimore had  of snow, and parts of Washington, D.C. recorded 15 inches, with nearby areas in Maryland reporting  or more, resulting in the shutdown of the federal government and the capital's two airports. New York City recorded .

On the morning of February 14, up to 100 vehicles were involved in multiple accidents on the eastbound lanes of the Pennsylvania Turnpike between Willow Grove and Bensalem from icy conditions. One accident involved about 75 vehicles, while another incident further east involved about 30 vehicles. There were a total of 30 injuries.

Damage
The fishing pier in Ocean City, Maryland, which had seen extensive damage from Hurricane Sandy, was damaged again in the storm. Strong waves and wind snapped seven pilings at the end of the pier.

The heavy snow from the storm contributed to roof collapses in several states. The roof caved in at a BP gas station in Roanoke, Virginia, and at a Shell gas station in Richmond, Virginia. Following a partial collapse, 100 people had to be evacuated from the studios of NBC Lancaster, Pennsylvania affiliate WGAL, and the station was unable to transmit live for an undetermined length of time. The roof and walls of a ShopRite supermarket in New Milford, New Jersey, collapsed under the weight of several feet of snow. Also in New Jersey, an elementary school in Wallington, a department store in Woodland Park, and a sports complex in Waldwick, were among at least a dozen buildings across Bergen and Passaic counties that partially collapsed on February 14. No major injuries were reported in any of the incidents.

Southeastern states were also struck with structural damages. The historic Craigie House in Atlanta collapsed except for its front façade, and the roof of a marina collapsed onto boats at Lake Lanier.

Snowfall accumulation totals

Note: Click "Show" to view table

Source: National Weather Service (Unofficial Totals as of 2/15/2014)

See also
 Blizzard
 Nor'easter
 List of Regional Snowfall Index Category 4 winter storms
 2013–14 North American winter
 Early 2014 North American cold wave
 November 13–21, 2014 North American winter storm
 February 2007 North America blizzard

References

External links
Winter Storm Pax: Anatomy of an Extra-Tropical Cyclone – Decoded Science

Storm,2014,02,11
2014 in Alabama
2014 in Connecticut
2014 in Delaware
2014 in Georgia (U.S. state)
2014 in Maine
2014 in Maryland
2014 in Massachusetts
2014 in Mississippi
2014 in New Hampshire
2014 in New Jersey
2014 in New York (state)
2014 in North Carolina
2014 in Pennsylvania
2014 in South Carolina
2014 in Tennessee
2014 in Texas
2014 natural disasters in the United States
2014 in Vermont
2014 in Virginia
2014 in Washington, D.C.
2014 in West Virginia
February 2014 events in the United States
Natural disasters in West Virginia